Alexander Sheridan (born 19 July 1948) is a retired Scottish amateur football left back who appeared in the Scottish League for Queen's Park. He also played in the Football League for Brighton & Hove Albion.

References

Scottish footballers
Scottish Football League players
Queen's Park F.C. players
Association football fullbacks
Living people
1948 births
Footballers from Motherwell
Brighton & Hove Albion F.C. players
English Football League players
Maidstone United F.C. (1897) players
Southern Football League players
Scotland amateur international footballers